Roel de Mon (November 5, 1919 in Haarlem – November 2, 1973 in Haarlem) was a Dutch baseball player.  He was claimed to be the fastest Dutch pitcher of all time. He flourished between 1940 and 1947. He helped to win the Hoofdklasse national baseball championship four times with SC Haarlem and Schoten. World War II disrupted De Mon's international career. He played only two games internationally against Belgium, and right after the war one against an American-Canadian Army team.

An army officer who was a Major League manager in daily life invited Roel de Mon to come and play baseball in the USA. De Mon stayed in the Netherlands to help build up the country after the war. 

Roel de Mon still possesses two Hoofdklasse records:

Most strikeouts in one season (1940): 235 strikeouts in 14 matches. (avg. over 16 per game)
Most strikeouts in a single game: 26 (1943 Schoten-VVGA).

He fanned 683 batters in 40 games in 1940, 1941 and 1943, averaging over 17 per contest.

Roel de Mon’s notorious superfast pitching had a backside: it caused a serious injury to his right arm and he had to end his baseball career in the late 1940s, to become an early living baseball legend.
Roel de Mon died in 1973 after serious heart failure, only three days before his 54th birthday.

Since 1969, the Roel de Mon Award is given to the best pitcher in the Dutch junior league, which was called the Roel de Mon league till the late 1980s. Winners have included Charles Urbanus jr, Harry Koster, Alexander Smit and David Bergman.

References

1919 births
1973 deaths
Dutch baseball players
Sportspeople from Haarlem